Prickly Pear is an uninhabited island of the British Virgin Islands in the Caribbean. Even though the island doesn't have permanent residents, it has a beach bar and recreational water sports facility on it.  It is located on the north side of North Sound, opposite Virgin Gorda.

The island was declared to be a National Park in 1988.

The island provides habitat for the common Puerto Rican ameiva (Ameiva exsul), crested anole (Anolis cristatellus wileyae), barred anole (Anolis stratulus), and the big-scaled least gecko (Sphaerodactylus macrolepis macrolepis). The island's flora includes agave (Agave missionum), and copperwood (Bursera simarouba).

References

Uninhabited islands of the British Virgin Islands